Puka Suntu (Quechua puka red, suntu heap, pile, "red heap", Hispanicized spelling Pucasunto) is a mountain in the Wansu mountain range in the Andes of Peru, about  high. It lies in the Arequipa Region, La Unión Province, Puyca District. Puka Suntu is situated at the bank of the Qumpi P'allqa River (Compepalca). Yuraq Rumi is to the northeast, beyond the river.

References 

Mountains of Arequipa Region